3174 Alcock is a carbonaceous Themistian asteroid from the outer region of the asteroid belt. It was discovered by American astronomer Edward Bowell at Lowell's U.S. Anderson Mesa Station in Flagstaff, Arizona, on 26 October 1984. It was named after British amateur astronomer George Alcock (1912–2000).

Orbit and classification 

The dark C-type asteroid is a member of the Themis family, a dynamical family of outer-belt asteroids with nearly coplanar ecliptical orbits. It orbits the Sun in the outer main-belt at a distance of 2.6–3.7 AU once every 5 years and 7 months (2,038 days). Its orbit has an eccentricity of 0.17 and an inclination of 2° with respect to the ecliptic.

Naming 

This minor planet was named by the discoverer for prolific British amateur astronomer George Alcock (1912–2000), who visually discovered 5 comets and 4 novae. The  was published by the Minor Planet Center on 5 November 1987.

Physical characteristics 

A rotational lightcurve of this asteroid was obtained from photometric observations made by French astronomer René Roy in February 2008. The lightcurve gave a rotation period of  hours with a brightness variation of 0.65 in magnitude.

According to the spaced-based survey carried out by the Japanese Akari satellite, the asteroid measures 18.66 kilometers in diameter and its surface has an albedo of 0.102, while the Collaborative Asteroid Lightcurve Link assumes an albedo of 0.08 and calculates a diameter of 18.71 kilometers.

References

External links 
 Lightcurve Database Query (LCDB), at www.minorplanet.info
 Dictionary of Minor Planet Names, Google books
 Asteroids and comets rotation curves, CdR – Geneva Observatory, Raoul Behrend
 Discovery Circumstances: Numbered Minor Planets (1)-(5000)  – Minor Planet Center
 
 

003174
003174
Discoveries by Edward L. G. Bowell
Named minor planets
19841026